Styxosaurus is a genus of plesiosaur of the family Elasmosauridae. Styxosaurus lived during the Campanian age of the Cretaceous period. Two species are known: S. snowii and S. browni.

Discovery

The holotype specimen of Styxosaurus snowii was described by S.W. Williston from a complete skull and 20 vertebrae.

Another more complete specimen -  SDSMT 451 was discovered near Iona, South Dakota, also in the US, in 1945. The specimen was originally described and named Alzadasaurus pembertoni by Welles and Bump (1949) and remained so until it was synonymized with S. snowii by Carpenter. Its chest cavity contained about 250 gastroliths, or "stomach stones". Although it is mounted at the School of Mines as if its head were looking up and out of the water, such a position would be physically impossible.

Styxosaurus is named for the mythological River Styx, which separated the Greek underworld from the world of the living. The -saurus part comes from the Greek , meaning "lizard" or "reptile."

The type specimen was found on Hell Creek in Logan County, Kansas and is the source of the genus name coined by Samuel Paul Welles, who described the genus, in 1943.

Description
Its sharp teeth were conical and were adapted to puncture and hold rather than to cut; like other plesiosaurs, Styxosaurus swallowed its food whole.

Classification
 
Styxosaurus snowii is from a group called elasmosaurs, and is closely related to Elasmosaurus platyurus, which was  found in Kansas, USA, in 1867.

The first Styxosaurus to be described was initially called Cimoliasaurus snowii by S.W. Williston in 1890. The specimen included a complete skull and more than 20 cervical vertebrae (  KUVP 1301) that were found near Hell Creek in western Kansas by Judge E.P. West.

The name was later changed to Elasmosaurus snowii by Williston in 1906 and then to Styxosaurus snowii by Welles in 1943.

A second species, Styxosaurus browni, was named by Welles in 1952. Although synonymized with Hydralmosaurus serpentinus by Kenneth Carpenter in 1999, it was revalidated by Rodrigo A. Otero in 2016.

The following cladogram shows the placement of Styxosaurus within Elasmosauridae following an analysis by Otero, 2016:

Palaeobiology
While most predators do not use gastroliths for grinding of food, almost all reasonably complete elasmosaur specimens include gastroliths. Although it is possible Styxosaurus may have used the stones as ballast, a Styxosaurus specimen found in the Pierre Shale of western Kansas included ground up fish bones mixed with the gastroliths. In addition, the weight of the gastroliths found in elasmosaur specimens is always much less than 1% of the estimated weight of the living animal.

While crocodiles and some other animals may use gastroliths for ballast today, it appears likely that elasmosaurs used them as a gastric mill. See Henderson (2006) contra Wings (2004).

Styxosaurus, like most other plesiosaurs, probably fed on belemnites, fish (Gillicus, etc.) and squid. With its interlocking teeth, Styxosaurus could grab on to its slippery prey before swallowing it.

Gallery

See also

 List of plesiosaur genera
 Timeline of plesiosaur research

Notes

References

Sources
Everhart, M. J. 2000. Gastroliths associated with plesiosaur remains in the Sharon Springs Member of the Pierre Shale (Late Cretaceous), western Kansas. Transactions of the Kansas Academy of Science 103(1-2): 58–69.
Cicimurri, D. J. and M. J. Everhart, 2001. An elasmosaur with stomach contents and gastroliths from the Pierre Shale (late Cretaceous) of Kansas. Kansas Acad. Sci. Trans 104(3-4):129-143.
Everhart, M. J. 2005a. Oceans of Kansas - A Natural History of the Western Interior Sea. Indiana University Press, 320 pp.
Everhart, M. J. 2005b. Elasmosaurid remains from the Pierre Shale (Upper Cretaceous) of western Kansas. Possible missing elements of the type specimen of Elasmosaurus platyurus Cope 1868? PalArch 4(3): 19–32.
Everhart, M. J. 2006. The occurrence of elasmosaurids (Reptilia: Plesiosauria) in the Niobrara Chalk of Western Kansas. Paludicola 5(4):170-183.
Henderson, J. 2006. Floating point: a computational study of buoyancy, equilibrium, and gastroliths in plesiosaurs. Lethaia 39: 227–244.
Welles, S. P. 1943. Elasmosaurid plesiosaurs with a description of the new material from California and Colorado. University of California Memoirs 13:125-254. figs.1-37., pls.12-29.
Welles, S. P. 1952. A review of the North American Cretaceous elasmosaurs. University of California Publications in Geological Sciences 29:46-144. figs. 1-25.
Welles, S. P. 1962. A new species of elasmosaur from the Aptian of Columbia and a review of the Cretaceous plesiosaurs. University of California Press, Berkeley and Los Angeles.
Welles, S. P. and Bump, J. 1949. Alzadasaurus pembertoni, a new elasmosaur from the Upper Cretaceous of South Dakota. Journal of Paleontology 23(5): 521–535.

External links 
 Styxosaurus at Oceans of Kansas
 Styxosaurus at National Geographic
 Styxosaurus snowii at Sachs Vertebrate Palaeontology Research

Late Cretaceous plesiosaurs of North America
Elasmosaurids
Fossil taxa described in 1943
Taxa named by Samuel Paul Welles
Sauropterygian genera